Bagmati Province is divided into 13 districts. A district is administrated by the head of the District Coordination Committee and the District Administration Officer. The districts are further divided to municipalities or rural municipalities.

District official include 
 Chief District Officer, an official under Ministry of Home Affairs is appointed by the government as the highest administrative officer in a district. The C.D.O is responsible for proper inspection of all the departments in a district such as health, education, security and all other government offices.
 District Coordination Committee acts as an executive to the District Assembly. The DCC coordinates with the Provincial Assembly to establish coordination between the Provincial Assembly and rural municipalities and municipalities and to settle disputes, if any, of political nature. It also maintains coordination between the provincial and Federal government and the local bodies in the district.

See also 

 List of Provinces of Nepal
 List of Districts of Nepal

 Lumbini Pradesh
2015 establishments in Nepal
States and territories established in 2015
districts of Bagmati Province